Shilandar (also Romanized as Shīlāndar; also known as Chilandar, Shalāndar, and Shelandār) is a village in Taham Rural District, in the Central District of Zanjan County, Zanjan Province, Iran. At the 2006 census, its population was 144, in 34 families.

References 

Populated places in Zanjan County